Ganbaataryn Odbayar (born 20 August 1989) is a Mongolian judoka. He competed at the 2016 Summer Olympics in the men's 73 kg event, in which he was eliminated in the third round by Nicholas Delpopolo. He won a bronze medal at the 2017 World Judo Championships in Budapest.

References

External links
 

1989 births
Living people
Mongolian male judoka
Olympic judoka of Mongolia
Judoka at the 2016 Summer Olympics
Asian Games medalists in judo
Judoka at the 2010 Asian Games
Judoka at the 2014 Asian Games
Asian Games silver medalists for Mongolia
Medalists at the 2014 Asian Games
Sportspeople from Ulaanbaatar
21st-century Mongolian people
20th-century Mongolian people